Štěpán Novotný (born 21 September 1990) is a Czech professional ice hockey winger. He is currently playing with the MsHK Žilina of the Slovak Extraliga (Slovak). He played 34 games for Lev Poprad of the Kontinental Hockey League (KHL) during the 2011–12 season.

Career statistics

References

External links 
 
 

1990 births
Living people
HC Bílí Tygři Liberec players
Czech ice hockey right wingers
Graz 99ers players
Indiana Ice players
Kelowna Rockets players
HC Kometa Brno players
HC Košice players
HC Lev Poprad players
MsHK Žilina players
HK Nitra players
Ice hockey people from Prague
HC Plzeň players
Swift Current Broncos players
HC Oceláři Třinec players
Czech expatriate ice hockey players in Canada
Czech expatriate ice hockey players in the United States
Czech expatriate ice hockey players in Slovakia
Expatriate ice hockey players in Austria
Czech expatriate sportspeople in Austria